Marie-Josée Saint-Pierre (born 1978 Murdochville, Quebec) is a Montreal-based filmmaker most notable for her animated documentary films.

After completing a BFA with honours in animation and an MFA in film production at Concordia University, she attended a Berlinale Talent Campus at the Berlin Film Festival in 2004, the Talent Lab at the Toronto International Film Festival in 2007, and participated in a three-month residency in Japan in Sapporo in 2009.

Her films include Post-Partum, McLaren's Negatives, Passages, The Sapporo Project, Femelles,  Flocons and Jutra. McLaren's Negatives, her first animated documentary, was shown in over 150 film festivals and received approximately 20 awards, including the Jutra Award for best animated film. She first became familiar with McLaren's work while studying at Concordia. Passages recounts the difficulties she had giving birth to her first child at Montreal's Hôpital Saint-Luc.

In 2004, Saint-Pierre founded MJSTP Films, her animation and documentary production company. There is a chapter devoted to her work in the 2010 book Animated Realism: A Behind The Scenes Look at the Animated Documentary Genre, published by Focal Press.

In 2009, she was selected as the international artist in residency for the S-AIR Inter-cross Creative Center in Sapporo, Japan. In January 2013, her work was featured in a retrospective at the Cinémathèque québécoise, where she also taught master classes.

In 2014, the National Film Board of Canada released Jutra, her animated documentary portrait on Quebec filmmaker Claude Jutra that was selected for the Director's Fortnight at the Cannes Film Festival.  The film won the Canadian Screen Award for best short documentary as well as the Jutra Award for best short animated film.  Saint-Pierre also released the same year the short film Flocons to celebrate the 100th anniversary of the birth of Norman McLaren. In 2016, she directed the short film Oscar based on the life and work of jazz pianist Oscar Peterson.

She produced Co Hoedeman's animated film The Blue Marble as well as The Delian Mode by Kara Blake. She also served as artistic director and animator on Patricio Henriquez's new feature film OUIGHURS:  Prisonners of the absurds . She is currently a PhD. student at Université du Québec à Montréal in the program Études et Pratiques des Arts.

Partial filmography
Her films include:
Post-Partum (2004)
McLaren's Negatives (2006)
Passages (2008)
The Sapporo Project (2010)
Femelles (2012)
Flocons (2014)
Jutra (2014)

Awards

JUTRA (2014) 
 Gémeaux award, Best animated television show 2015 (Canada)
 Jutra award, Best short animated film 2015 (Canada)
 Canadian Screen Awards, Best short documentary 2015 (Canada)
 Méliès "Light of Québec", Festival du Film Court de Mont-Tremblant 2014 (Canada)
 Mention best animated film from Canada, Sommets du cinéma d’animation 2014 (Canada)

Femelles (2012) 
Best Short Documentary Film, St.Louis International Film Festival 2012 (USA)

Passages (2008) 
 Best Documentary Film, Sapporo International Shortfest 2009 (Japan)
 Best Animation Film, Brooklyn International Film Festival 2009 (USA)
 Public Award for Best Foreign Short Film Public, Créteil's Woman Film Festival 2009 (France)
 Special Jury Award, Personal Expression and Advocacy, Austin Festival 2008 (USA)
 Honorable Mention, Best Canadian Short Film, Atlantic Film Festival 2008 (Canada)
 Special Mention, Golden Key Award, Kassel Dokumentarfilm und Videofest 2008 (Germany)
 PASSAGES was nominated for the 2010 GENIE for Best Short Documentary Film (Canada)
 PASSAGES was selected for the Canada Top Ten, Best Short Films, by the Toronto International Film Festival Group, 2009 (Canada)

McLaren's Negatives (2006)
 Jutra Award for Best Animated Film 2007 (Québec)
 Sterling Short Honorable Mention, Silverdocs 2006 (USA)
 Best Debut Film, Animation, Message to Man International Film Festival 2006 (Russia)
 Best Short Contemporary Film, Sapporo International Shortfest 2006 (Japan)
 Bar in Gold, Festival Der Nationen 2006 (Austria)
 Best Short Documentary Film, Animation Block Party New York 2006 (USA)
 Best Animation Film, Dokufest 2006 (Kosovo)
 Best International Documentary, Santiago International Short Film Festival 2006 (Chile)
 Best Director Animation, Monstramundo 2006 (Brazil)
 Best Script Animation, Monstramundo 2006 (Brazil)
 Youth Jury Award for Most Inspirational Short Film, Real 2 Real International Film Festival for Youth 2007 (Canada)
 First Prize in the Documentary Section, 10 Mostra Internacional de Curtmetratges de Sagunt 2007 (Spain)
 Best Documentary, PA Film Institute Festival 2007 (USA)
 Platinum Remi, Best Animation, Worldfest Houston 2007 (USA)
 Special Jury Prize, Outstanding Direction Documentary, Indianapolis Film Festival 2007 (USA)
 Best Documentary, Arizona International Film Festival 2007 (USA)
 Special Jury Award for Best Animated Film, Ismailia International Film Festival 2007 (Egypt)
 Best Documentary, Filmest Badalona Festival 2007 (Spain)
 Honorable Mention, Best Short International Film, Festival International de Curtas de Belo Horizonte 2006 (Brazil)
 Honorable Mention, International Animation Competition, Monterrey International Festival 2006 (Mexico)
 Special Mention Animation, Seddicorto International Festival 2006 (Italia)
 Special Mention Animation, Luciana Film Festival 2006 (Italia)

Post-Partum (2004)
 Special Jury Prize for Most Innovative Approach, Guangzhou International Documentary Festival 2005 (China)
 Gold Special Jury Award, Worldfest Houston 2005 (USA)
 GAIA Award, Moondance International Film Festival 2005 (USA)
 Shoestring Award, Rochester International Film Festival 2005 (USA)
 Artistic Development Award, Imperial Tobacco Canada Arts Council 2004
 J.A. De Sève Graduate Award 2004, Mel Hoppenheim School of Cinema (Canada)

References

External links
MJSTP Films website

1978 births
Living people
Film directors from Montreal
Concordia University alumni
People from Gaspésie–Îles-de-la-Madeleine
French Quebecers
Canadian documentary film directors
Canadian animated film directors
Canadian women film directors
Canadian women animators
Directors of Genie and Canadian Screen Award winners for Best Short Documentary Film
Academic staff of Université Laval
Canadian women documentary filmmakers